Soup Number Five, variously spelled Soup No. 5 or Soup #5, is a soup made from bull's testes or penis. The dish originates from Filipino cuisine. It is believed to have aphrodisiac properties.

Regional appellation
Cebu's variant of Soup Number Five is called lansiao or lanciao and is a popular street dish. Its name 'lansiao' was adapted from Chinese descendants who speak Hokkien, of which Hokkien  refers to the male's genitals.

Soup Number Five also known as Remember Me (usually shortened to RM) in Cagayan de Oro. The name originates from the name of a restaurant specializing in Soup Number Five. The name has become the most common name for Soup Number Five in Mindanao, supplanting its other names in the northern regions of the Philippines.

See also

 Rocky Mountain oysters
 Tiger penis soup
 Cow cod soup

References

Philippine soups
Aphrodisiac foods